John Michael Ferrari (born November 11, 1947), is an American singer-songwriter, entertainer, music arranger, composer, and author.

Early years 
Ferrari was sent to the Nevada State Children's Home at age 15 and joined the United States Army at age 18 serving in the Vietnam War.

Entertainment industry 
Singer songwriter John Michael Ferrari started his entertainment careers as a singer/composer, writing musical jingles as well as performing in live concerts and, with Pepper Jay continues as a performing coach whose clients included Liquid Blue (Pop Album of the Year: LA Music Awards), Nikki Nova (Top 10 International Taiwan Idol), Allison Iraheta (American Idol, Season 8, Top 4), and Gisell (Winner: Talentos Premios).

Ferrari has been writing songs since he was a kid. Ferrari's first song of note, "Dustoff" was penned while serving in the Vietnam War and is a favorite among Veterans on Ferrari's "My Early Life" album, along with songs "Let's Run Away to Alaska," "Run," and "When Love Said Good-bye," all which he performs regularly as an entertainer or keynote concert speaker at resorts, clubs, charity events and causes, including those hosted by International Myeloma Foundation, The Thalians and City of Hope. Ferrari enjoys sharing and often provides opportunities to his performance students as they share Ferrari's "Teen Tunes" on stage with him.

Ferrari and Pepper Jay presently have two versions of The John Michael Ferrari Band, one which performs in the greater Las Vegas area with Nevada players and the other in the greater Nashville area with Nashville players.   Ferrari currently performs his original songs with Dr. John Nowins aka "Sexy Sticks" on drums, Dr. David Miller aka "The Professor" on bass, Dr. Bruce Topper aka Nomad on keys, Brad Torchin or Dylan Bodley on lead guitar, and the beautiful vocalists Katie Jensen, Carol Champney, Brandi MacLaren, and/or Tarryn Aimee.

Ferrari's previous Band, "Ferrari & Friends," entertained from 1990 through 2010, with Thurston Watts, Mack Doughtery, Pat Zicara, Katie Jensen, Norman A. Norman, Russell Watts, Al Boyd, Kenyatta Mackey, Al Vescovo, and Allison Iraheta.

As photographer and director of photography, Ferrari worked with top models and up-and-coming filmmakers. His credits include the "Minor Matters" CD for the musical group "Peoples Republic" and movie posters for "Redemption" by Agenda Pictures.

As a director, his credits include the film "Hercules in Hollywood," the TV pilot "The Road Studio," and TV episodes for the W Network in Canada.

John Michael Ferrari is Creative Producer, director, and editor, who, along with music partner Pepper Jay of Pepper Jay Productions LLC founded Actors Reporter and Actors Entertainment online magazines. Ferrari and Jay also founded the label, Cappy Records.

Ferrari graced the cover of "Hollywood Weekly" with a 6-page article. (February 2020.)

Ferrari is the author of Acting with your Eyes. Along with Pepper Jay, Ferrari is the co-author of "Dynamic Song Performance, the Singer's Bible."

Musical career 
Ferrari (ASCAP & Nashville Songwriters Association International) is known for writing and performing dozens of his original songs, penning the lyrics and creating the musical arrangements.

Ferrari began his professional songwriting career in 1990 with Pepper Jay as his producer in Los Angeles, California.  The two first met while Ferrari was performing at the Highland Springs Resort, in Cherry Valley, California.

An early collaboration with Pepper Jay resulted in Ferrari's first album, "My Early Life," produced by Pepper Jay and mastered by George Velmer and John Vestman, for Pepper Jay Productions on the Cappy Records Label (1990).  This album contains Ferrari's earliest songs, When Love Said Good-Bye, Ain’t No Mistaken, Brand New River, Breaking Up Inside, Dustoff, Let's Run Away to Alaska, Run, Sentimental Fool, That's What You Do, Why'd Momma Lie, and When Love Said Good-Bye Instrumental.  "John Michael Ferrari’s My Early Life is a Tribute to His Eventful Past" 

Ferrari's songs are available on most musical platforms, including Apple Music, Spotify, and Amazon Music.

Ferrari was named "Male Singer Songwriter of the Year" by the F.A.M.E. Awards (2019), and his song, "Like a Rock and Roll Band" was awarded "Peace Song of the Year" by the Hollywood Tribute to the Oscars and Art 4 Peace (2020).  Ferrari was awarded for "Outstanding Triple A Album" by the Producer's Choice Honors (2020).  Ferrari was voted Rising Star 2020 by the eZWay Golden Gala, as well as Crossover Artist of the Year 2021 by the New Music Awards. John Michael Ferrari was also featured on the cover of eZWay Magazine 2021  and Hollywood Weekly Nashville 2021.

Ferrari's most recent collaboration with Pepper Jay is his album, "Be the Smile on Your Face" under their independent label, Cappy Records. This album contains Ferrari's most recent song creations, Be the Smile on Your Face, Don't Need a Reason, I Don't Want to Love, If We Could Be Lovers, Keep Falling All Over Myself, Nowhere to LA, Peggy Sues, So Beautiful, Somewhere We Could Fall, What Are You Doing, Who Can Blame a Broken Heart, and You Should Be Winning.   "A fun-loving, storytelling Nam Vet from Hollywood, CA, John Michael Ferrari pours out a whiskey-hued glass of Pop, Country, Gospel, Blues and Jazz in his music." "Be the Smile on Your Face begins with the title track and immediately the listener is treated to the tenderness and soul provided by John Michael Ferrari’s excellent vocal performances."

The singles off the "Be the Smile on Your Face" album, "So Beautiful", "Somewhere We Could Fall" and "Be the Smile on Your Face" are climbing several country and adult contemporary radio charts.

Ferrari's unpublished cross-genre, country, pop, Christian songs are plentiful. John Michael Ferrari's songs are still produced by Pepper Jay.

Discography

Studio albums
 My Early Life (1990)
 Be the Smile on Your Face (2020)

Singles
 Dustoff  (2011)
 Let’s Run Away to Alaska  (2011)
 Don’t Fall Between the Daylight  (2011)
 Why’d Momma Lie?  (2018)
 Sentimental Fool I Keep Dreaming  (2019)
 Bad Dream  (2020)
 Keep Falling All Over Myself  (2020)
 The Son Don’t Lie  (2020)
 My Heart Can't Breathe  (2021)

Showlist

References

External links 
 
 John Michael Ferrari
 Images by Ferrari

1947 births
Living people
American male singer-songwriters
American male actors
American directors
American photographers
American male composers
21st-century American composers
Singer-songwriters from California
21st-century American male musicians